The term bank charge covers all charges and fees made by a bank to their customers. In common parlance, the term often relates to charges in respect of personal current accounts or checking account. These charges may take many forms, including:

 monthly charges for the provision of an account
 charges for specific transactions (other than overdraft limit excesses)
 interest in respect of overdrafts (whether authorised or unauthorised by the bank)
 charges for exceeding authorised overdraft limits, or making payments (or attempting to make payments) where no authorised overdraft exists.

Much of the following discussion relates to the UK personal current account market.

Monthly account charges
Banks may charge their customers a fixed monthly charge for the provision of the account. In the UK, this was not common practice until the 1990s when banks began to introduce this type of bank charges as a means of product differentiation - often offering additional services bundled with the bank account itself (e.g. travel insurance, mobile phone insurance, preferential rates on other products).

Charges for specific transactions
Until the 1980s, most banks in the UK charged for all transactions. A number of newer entrants to the personal current account market took a "no fees whilst in credit" approach, leading very rapidly to a situation where no bank could compete with others without offering the same deal.

While the loss of income incurred was, to some extent, covered by the interest earned on carrying balances in current accounts, the banks' profitability on personal current accounts was severely impacted by this change in the charging structure. In turn this led to the banks' increased use of charges for exceeding overdraft limits as a means of generating their required level of profitability.

Interest in respect of overdrafts
Most banks charge interest to their customers in respect of overdrafts. It is common to charge differentially for authorised and unauthorised overdrafts, with unauthorised overdrafts often bearing an interest rate two or three times higher than authorised ones.

In order to gain customers from competitors, banks will sometimes offer introductory 0% or low interest rates on authorised overdrafts, together with generous initial overdraft limits.

As part of the development of the personal current account market in the UK, certain banks have altered their overdraft charging structure to a fixed daily charge, irrespective of the size of the overdrawn balance.

Charges for exceeding authorised overdraft limits
As banks' income from transaction charges declined, due to the "free banking" that had become the de facto standard in the UK personal current account market and the banks' income from carrying balances fell due to declining interest rates, banks sought to increase the profitability of their businesses by significantly increasing the charges levied for exceeding authorised overdraft limits, or when customers make payments (or attempt to make payments), including direct debits, cheque payments or standing orders, where no authorised overdraft limit exists. Typically banks charged in the region of £25 to £39 for transactions in breach of an authorised overdraft limit, irrespective of the size of the transaction or the degree by which the limit was exceeded. Research undertaken by Moneysupermarket.com in 2007 reported the dramatic differences between the unauthorised overdraft charges of various banks as "lacking "consistency" and causing injustice.

These charges are commonly referred to as "penalty charges", although penalty charges are generally unenforceable under English law. Many individuals were able to retrieve money paid in such fees through the Magistrates' Courts on these grounds. However this has since been halted by the decision in the case OFT v Abbey. The High Court and Court of Appeal ruled that these charges were not penal in nature, and the Supreme Court further ruled that they cannot be regulated by the Office of Fair Trading.

Transfer redirection charges 
A Redirection of Transfer charge is included in bank charges and are only required on specific transfer occasions only. A redirection fee is a bank charge that is only paid to a bank when a mistake is made by another bank and a sum of amount is transferred into a wrong bank account in another bank. This may occur between continents, countries or states. A redirection fee is often expensive when required as the bank requiring this may not have legal rights to freeze the account the funds are mistakenly transferred into. It may also require urgent attention depending on the banking rules of the country and it takes a period of 30–45 minutes for a redirected transfer to be completed. This is normally caused in a Bank Wire Transfer, Telegraphic Transfer also known as Telex Transfer (T/T) and most times, local bank to bank transfer. A redirection fee is only needed to be paid to the bank the funds are in and the bank will have to redirect the transfer to its correct destination. Most banks calculate this type of bank charge according to the amount in question.

See also

Overdraft
Overdraft fee
OFT v Abbey
Unavailable funds fee

References

External links
 The Guardian, 23 June 2009, Canada: Where bank charges are usual

Banking in the United Kingdom
Banking terms